Nicholas Trefusis (died c. 1648) was an English politician who sat in the House of Commons of England variously between 1628 and 1648.

Origins
Nicholas Trefusis was the last of the line of a branch of the Trefusis family living at Lezant in Cornwall. The Trefusis family originated at the manor of Trefusis in the parish of Mylor, near Falmouth, in Cornwall. The present representative of the Trefusis family is Baron Clinton, of Heanton Satchville, Huish, Devon, the largest private landowner in Devon.

Career
Trefusis was elected as Member of Parliament for Newport in Cornwall in 1628 and held the seat until 1629 when King Charles I decided to rule without parliament. In April 1640 Trefusis was re-elected as MP for Newport for the Short Parliament. In 1646 was elected as MP for Cornwall as a replacement in the Long Parliament for Royalists who had lost their lives, but was excluded in Pride's Purge in 1648.

Trefusis made his will in 1647 and died thereafter.

Marriages and children
He married and had two daughters.

References

 

1640s deaths
Members of the pre-1707 English Parliament for constituencies in Cornwall
English MPs 1628–1629
English MPs 1640 (April)
English MPs 1640–1648
Year of birth unknown